Felix Moritz Warburg (January 14, 1871October 20, 1937) was a German-born American banker. He was a member of the Warburg banking family of Hamburg, Germany.

Early life
Warburg was born in Hamburg, Germany, on January 14, 1871. He was a grandson of Moses Marcus Warburg, one of the founders of the bank, M. M. Warburg (in 1798) and son of Moritz and Charlotte Esther Oppenheim Warburg. Felix's first job at age 16 was in Hamburg, Germany, with N.M. Oppenheim & Co. Felix Warburg was a partner in Kuhn, Loeb & Co.

Career
Warburg was a presidential elector in the 1908 U.S. presidential election.

Warburg was an important leader of the American Jewish Joint Distribution Committee, established to help the Jews in Europe in the period leading up to, and especially during, the Great Depression. Warburg actively raised funds in the United States on behalf of European Jews who faced hunger following World War I. As early as 1919, he was quoted in The New York Times discussing the dire situation of Jewish war sufferers.

Warburg served as the founder and first president of the American Friends of the Hebrew University, which supports the Hebrew University of Jerusalem in Jerusalem, Mandate Palestine, in 1925.

Warburg and the Joint Distribution Committee were also instrumental in the 1930s after the global Great Depression following the crash of the New York stock exchange in 1929. More interested in his charitable work than banking, after Hitler seized power, Felix gave money to help aid Jews flee Germany. Before he died, Warburg gave $10,000,000 to Jewish causes around the world.

John L. Spivak claimed General Smedley Butler had named Warburg before Congress as part of the Business Plot.

Personal life

He married Frieda Schiff (1876–1958), daughter of Jacob Henry Schiff (1847–1920) and Therese Loeb Schiff, on March 19, 1895, in New York.  They had four sons and one daughter:
 Frederick Marcus Warburg (1897–1973), married to Wilma L. Shannon
 Gerald Felix Warburg (c.1902–1971), married first to Marion Bab and then to Natica Nast, the daughter of Condé Montrose Nast
 Paul Felix Warburg
 Edward Mortimer Morris Warburg (1908-1992), married to Mary Warburg
 Carola Warburg Rothschild (1896–1987), married to Walter N. Rothschild, son of Simon F. Rothschild, chairman of the board of Abraham & Straus, and founder of the Federated Department Stores Her daughter, Carol Warburg Rothschild, is the mother of Peter A. Bradford and grandmother of Arthur Bradford.

All of their children were active in community service. In 1927 Warburg purchased and donated four Stradivari instruments for the members of the newly formed Musical Art Quartet (from the Institute of Musical Art, now Juilliard): Sascha Jacobsen, Bernard Ocko, Louis Kaufman, and Marie Roemaet-Rosanov.

He died on October 20, 1937 in New York City. He was buried in Salem Fields Cemetery in Brooklyn.

Legacy
As a result of his philanthropic activities, a new Jewish village established in Mandate Palestine in 1939, Kfar Warburg, was named after him.  He was a trustee of the Jewish Theological Seminary in New York.

The Felix M. Warburg House, in New York's Upper East side was donated by his widow and today houses the Jewish Museum.

References

Further reading
Yehuda Bauer (1974) My Brother's Keeper. A History of the American Jewish Joint Distribution Committee 1929-1939 Jewish Publication Society of America, Philadelphia,

External links

M.M. Warburg & Co.

Archives and records
Felix M. Warburg papers at Baker Library Special Collections, Harvard Business School.

1871 births
1937 deaths
Businesspeople from Hamburg
Jewish American bankers
American philanthropists
German bankers
German emigrants to the United States
19th-century German Jews
German philanthropists
Jewish American philanthropists
Loeb family
Felix
1908 United States presidential electors
Burials at Salem Fields Cemetery